Our Revolution (sometimes known by its initials OR) is an American progressive political action organization spun out of Senator Bernie Sanders's 2016 presidential campaign to continue its work. The organization's mission is to educate voters about issues, get people involved in the political process, and work to organize and elect progressive candidates. Our Revolution is also the title of a book by Sanders released in November 2016.

Launch and focus
The organization officially launched on August 24, 2016, designated as a 501(c)(4), with a presentation that was live-streamed online via YouTube to meetings across the country and shown by Free Speech TV. Our Revolution's three main goals are to (1) revitalize American democracy by engaging millions of individuals in the political processes, (2) empower the next generation of progressive leaders, and (3) elevate political consciousness by educating the public about issues confronting the United States.

More specifically, the organization aims to create, support, promote and elect progressive candidates from school board to US Senate; support and help pass progressive ballot measures; create, train and mobilize activists; and both support and participate in protests against issues such as the Trans-Pacific Partnership and Dakota Access Pipeline. The progressive issues Our Revolution promotes are almost identical to those of Sanders's 2016 presidential campaign: reducing income and wealth inequality, working for single-payer healthcare, reducing the price of prescription drugs, instituting a $15 minimum wage, expanding Social Security, creating jobs, and making public colleges and universities tuition-free. The organization will support minority rights, specifically African American, Latino and Native American rights, including government respect of treaties with Native Americans. Organizations that support Our Revolution include People for Bernie, National Nurses United, and the Communications Workers of America, among others.

Staffing

The organization's staff include chairman Larry Cohen and president Nina Turner, both of whom are also national co-chairs of Bernie Sanders's presidential campaign. Erika Andiola, the Sanders campaign's Latino press secretary, has joined the organization's communications staff. Our Revolution's 501(c)(4) designation prevents Sanders from playing a role in the organization because he is an elected official.

On August 29, 2016, the board of Our Revolution was announced as:

 Larry Cohen (Chairman) – Labor
 Nina Turner (President) – Former Ohio State Senator
 Deborah Parker – Native American Leader
 Ben Jealous – Civil Rights Leader
 Jim Hightower – Political Leader, National Radio Commentator & Writer
 James Zogby – Arab American Human Rights Leader
 Huck Gutman – Former Chief of Staff for Senator Bernie Sanders
 Jane Fleming Kleeb – Environmental Activist
 Lucy Flores – Former Nevada Assemblywoman
 Catalina Velasquez – Immigration, Reproductive Justice and Trans Queer Liberation Activist
 Shailene Woodley – Actress and Environmental Activist

At the start, the organization faced a significant staffing challenge as eight of its initial 15 staffers left before the launch when Weaver was chosen as president. They objected to the way he had handled Sanders's presidential campaign and to his decision to make Our Revolution a 501(c)(4). Some staffers also left in protest of a lack of diversity among the organization's leaders. The remaining staff was subsequently joined by an additional three staffers, bringing the total to ten.

2016 election 
During the 2016 election, the organization supported several ballot measures and candidates, with $1.3 million raised. Of the 106 candidates and 34 ballot initiatives Our Revolution supported, 58 candidates and 23 ballot initiatives won in 2016. Our Revolution, like Sanders, opposed the presidential candidacy of Donald Trump. After Trump's election, Our Revolution issued the following statement:We will do everything in our power to ensure that the president-elect cannot ignore the battles Americans are facing every single day. Our job is to offer a real alternative vision and engage on the local and national level to continue the work of the political revolution in the face of a divided nation.Sanders himself announced, "I intend to work with President Trump on those issues where he will, in fact, work for the middle class and working families of this country. I will vigorously oppose him if he appeals to racism or sexism or some of the other discriminatory measures that he brought up during his campaign."

Chairman Larry Cohen cited populist sentiment and cautioned that political and economic elitists may face backlash in upcoming elections.

Post-2016 political activism
In January 2017, Our Revolution activists worked in local elections in California to advance Sanders's agenda. According to executive director Shannon Jackson, Our Revolution is "going to continue to do this around the states".

A May 2018 article in Politico described Our Revolution as "flailing" and "in disarray". According to the article, by May 2018 the organization's monthly fundraising totals were one-third of what they were in May 2017. Moreover, the article noted internal conflicts and tensions within the organization, such as that board members and Sanders 2016 presidential delegates questioned Our Revolution president Nina Turner's actions and motives. Specifically, they questioned whether Turner was using the organization as a springboard for a presidential run of her own and whether she was "settl[ing] scores with the Democratic National Committee from 2016". Turner attempted to hire Tezlyn Figaro—who frequently appeared on Fox News to praise Trump and has made anti-immigration comments—as the chief of staff, but was overruled by the board's executive committee. Additionally, Lucy Flores resigned from the board in April 2018 due to what she claims was the organization's lack of outreach to the Latino community. Our Revolution also endorsed Dennis Kucinich for governor in Ohio in 2018, which some Ohio Democrats questioned because of Turner's close relationship with Kucinich's running mate, even though he was widely considered the most progressive candidate in that race.

A subsequent article in The New Republic concurred with the Politico report and suggested that change may be necessary at Our Revolution for it to succeed at its goals. After Politico reported the discontent with Figaro's position in the organization, Turner announced that Figaro would still be part of the organization and noted that Figaro's anti-immigrant and pro-Trump commentary was not endorsed by Turner or Our Revolution. Figaro said that she "offer[s] no excuse" for her comments and questioned the motivations of those who spoke to Politico about her. Erika Andiola, an undocumented immigrant who was a former political director at Our Revolution, said that Turner fired her after her activism in favor of the DREAM Act.

The Young Turks, a progressive American news and commentary program on YouTube, discussed the Politico article on their May 21 show, calling it an "attack piece". Cenk Uygur strongly objected to its claims and denied its accuracy, including its assertions that the group "has left many Sanders supporters disillusioned" and that the group has "fueled doubts about Sanders' organizational ability heading into 2020".

Our Revolution board member James Zogby disputed the Politico report in a series of tweets, calling it a "hit piece fueled [by] a few disgruntled souls out to harm [Nina Turner]." The Politico article has also been criticized by others on similar grounds, as well as for its anonymous sourcing and lack of quotes. An article published by Common Dreams also broadly disputed the Politico article, as did a Naked Capitalism piece.

Summer for Progress 
Several progressive organizations, including Fight for 15, Justice Democrats, Democratic Socialists of America, National Nurses United, Working Families Party, and Brand New Congress, announced in July 2017 a push to encourage House Democrats to sign on to a #PeoplesPlatform, which consists of supporting "eight bills currently in the House of Representatives that will address the concerns of everyday Americans." These eight bills and the topics they address are:
 Medicare for All: H.R. 676 Medicare For All Act
 Free College Tuition: H.R. 1880 College for All Act of 2017
 Worker Rights: H.R.15 - Raise the Wage Act 
 Women's Rights: H.R.771 - Equal Access to Abortion Coverage in Health Insurance (EACH Woman) Act of 2017 
 Voting Rights: H.R. 2840 - Automatic Voter Registration Act
 Environmental Justice: H.R. 2242 - Keep It in the Ground Act of 2017
 Criminal Justice and Immigrant Rights: H.R. 3227 - Justice is Not For Sale Act of 2017
 Taxing Wall Street: H.R. 1144 - Inclusive Prosperity Act

References

External links
 

2016 establishments in the United States
Bernie Sanders
Bernie Sanders 2016 presidential campaign
Organizations established in 2016
Democratic Party (United States) organizations
Progressive organizations in the United States
United States political action committees
501(c)(4) nonprofit organizations